Garling is a surname. Notable people with the surname include:

Caleb Garling, American writer
Frederick Garling (1775–1848), English-born Australian lawyer
Frederick Garling Jr., (1806-1873) was an Australian government official and artist
Henry Garling (1870–1942), Australian politician
Jean Garling (1907–1998), Australian writer and dancer
Peter Garling (born 1952), Australian judge